Metropolitan Suite is an album by electronic music composer Larry Fast, released in 1987 through Audion Records. It is the ninth and final record in his Synergy project.

Track listing

Personnel
Murray Brenman – illustrations, design
Larry Fast – instruments, production, engineering, illustrations
Bob Ludwig – mastering
Neil Nappe – engineering assistant
Miguel Pagliere – photography
Bill Parker – light sculpture
Pete Turner – photography

External links

References

1987 albums